Nala Damajanti was the stage name of a late 19th-century snake charmer who toured with P.T. Barnum's circus and performed at the famed Folies Bergère in Paris. French sources identify her as Emilie Poupon (1861–?) of Nantey, Jura Department, France. Promotional posters of Nala Damajanti have been widely reproduced and are thought to have inspired one of the popular folk images of the African water spirit Mami Wata. Similar acts performing under slightly variant names such as Mala Damajaute, Nata Damajaute, and Nala Damajante are thought to have been the same person.

Origins 
A 17 March 1887 French-language article in Le Gaulois revealed that Nala Damajanti was born Emilie Poupon in Nantey, France on 4 July 1861. In 1881 she was working as a governess with a French family in St. Petersburg, Russia, when she fell in love with and later married a ceiling-walking acrobat by the name of Palmer who introduced her to the art of snake charming. A record of her marriage to John Palmer in Walworth, Surrey, England on 20 Apr 1886 gives her full name as Mathilde Marie Amelia Poupon, aged 24, and her father's name as Xavier Poupon. After developing her skills, she toured in America and joined Barnum's famous circus troupe in 1885. She then returned to Paris to perform at the Folies Bergère (debuting on 18 February 1887).

The revelation of Nala Damajanti's given name was prompted by a lawsuit, in which the plaintiff had confused her with another person. As Poupon was scheduled to depart for Hamburg in the near future, with her eight enormous boas, she allowed her true identity to be revealed to have the case resolved as soon as possible.

Most Nala Damajanti posters claim that she was a Hindu, and the name is apparently a combination of the names of husband-and-wife characters from the Indian epic the Mahabharata, Nala and Damajanti.

Henry Drewal indicated that in Hamburg, Germany, a professional animal dealer named Breitwieser who often worked as a specialist snake procurer with the Tierpark Hagenbeck, a famous zoo in Hamburg, returned from a supposed trip to Asia with a new wife who performed as a snake charmer under the name of Maladamajaute, starting around 1880. Drewal supposed that she might have come from Samoa or Borneo. Lademann-Priemer goes to some lengths to demonstrate the possibility of this idea. Lorenz Hagenbeck, son of Carl Hagenbeck, the zoo's founder, recalled in his autobiography that Breitwieser's wife had "done stage business with snakes" and that Breitwieser had been a showman at one time.

Carl Hagenbeck fondly recalled her in a section of his 1909 autobiography Von Tieren und Menschen, though in the 1912 abridged English translation, that portion was omitted. Hagenbeck refers to her as a "Provençalin" (a native of Provence). He further relates that she married an (unnamed) circus ceiling-walker, and they developed an innovative snake taming technique that allowed them to create an extremely successful act that toured America under the name Nala Damajante to much acclaim. Hagenbeck remarks that she was his best snake customer for some time and describes her as having an extraordinarily graceful figure, with large, attractive dark eyes, and long unusually dark hair.

On 4 October 1884, "Nala Damajanta" published a notice in the New York Clipper that she had severed her relationship with her manager John Palmer. On 11 October, John Palmer (son of prominent ceiling-walker James Palmer) published a notice in the same publication that "Nala Damajanta (so called) whom I had engaged for the last three years" had severed their business relationship unilaterally. He asserted his rights to the name under that and other spellings and stated that he had engaged another performer from Europe to come to America and continue the act. In 1894, Palmer was still managing the act and was referred to as "husband of Nala Damajanti" in his 1896 obituary.

In a humorous anecdote recounted in Puck, while traveling with the Forepaugh circus, Nala Damajante was reported to have stated that she was from Connecticut. However, in a 9 January 1884 interview for the Daily Alta California, she claimed to be 24 years old and born in the "French settlements of Judea." The reporter noted that her command of English seemed to be "so poor that no attempt is made here to reproduce her queer pronunciation and phraseology." In 1885, when she was playing at Madison Square Garden, a New York Tribune interview indicated a strong French accent, and her husband John Palmer ("Prodigious Palmer, the Human Fly") was said to have translated much of the conversation. Then, she gave her birthplace as one of the "French provinces of India" and relayed that her father was "a hunter of wild beasts for native and European menageries." In 1894 interview for the London weekly To-Day, during a run at the Palace Theatre, she claimed to be a native of Pondicherry.

Legacy 
A poster of Nala Damajanti has been noted as "one of the most beautiful" to have come out of the Folies Bergėre. Even in the early 21st century, her posters are widely reproduced. Nala Damajanti's image is thought to have inspired popular folk depictions of the African water spirit Mami Wata and of the Dominican spiritual figure Santa Marta la Dominadora. The proximate source of this transmission may have been a calendar published in Bombay, India in 1955, which reproduced a Maladamajaute image.

Nala Damajanti is thought to have been an inspiration for a limited series of highly prized automata produced in 1907 by the noted French firm Roullet & Decamps titled "la Charmeuse de Serpent," one of which was auctioned for a then-record price in 1977. A 1907 painting by Henri Rousseau with the same theme, titled La Charmeuse de serpents ("The snake charmer") may have been inspired by the same source.

Notes and references 

French circus performers
People from Jura (department)
1861 births
Sideshow performers
Year of death unknown